Harper B. Smith (January 1873 – August 3, 1917) was the official photographer for Atlantic City, New Jersey, and a photographer for Underwood & Underwood.

Biography
He was born in York, Pennsylvania, in January 1873. Around 1892 he moved to Atlantic City, New Jersey. He died on August 3, 1917.

References

1873 births
1917 deaths
American photojournalists
People from York, Pennsylvania
People from Atlantic City, New Jersey
Journalists from Pennsylvania